Ernst Haider (* 16 November 1890 in Munich; † 27 January 1988 in Starnberg) was a German painter and graphic artist.

Life 
Ernst Haider was the son of bavarian landscape artist and art professor Karl Michael Haider and his second wife Ernestine Schwarz. He enrolled at the Academy of Fine Arts Munich and studied drawing in Angelo Jank's class together with Walther Kerschensteiner. 1947 he was elected for the board of the Kunstverein München. His oevre has been on display in various locations amongst others in the elementary school Gräfelfing in a group display of the literary association Gräfelfin in April 1953. Until his death he lived in the artists' colony in Stockdorf. After his death his paintings had been displayed in a retrospective in Gauting.

Selected works 
 1924: Verschneites Hochtal
 1926: Oberbayerische Landschaften. Mappe mit 6 Radierungen. München: Selbstverlag Ernst Haider
 1927: Blick auf St. Moritzer See
 1935: Sommerliche Weidelandschaft
 1942: Blick auf Bettwar im Taubertal
 1954: Akt bei der Morgentoilette
 1961: Weiblicher Akt mit Kopftuch

Literature 
 Ernst Haider: Karl Haider (1846–1912), Gedächtnis-Ausstellung, Glaspalast, 17. Mai bis 21. Juni 1925 / Münchener Neue Sezession. München: Wolf & Sohn, 1925.
 Ernst Haider: Karl Haider. Leben und Werk eines Süddeutschen Malers. Augsburg: Filser, 1926.
 Ernst Haider: Zu meinen Bildern, 1937.

References

External links
 Ernst Haider on artnet

1890 births
1988 deaths
20th-century German painters
20th-century German male artists
German male painters
Modern painters
Academy of Fine Arts, Munich alumni